Bangkok Football Club or formerly Bangkok Bravo Football Club (renamed in 2010), is a professional Thai football club from Bangkok, Thailand. The club is currently playing in the Thai League 3 Bangkok metropolitan region.

History
Bangkok F.C. was founded in 1999 as Bangkok Bravo F.C., and then it was renamed to Bangkok F.C. in 2010, when Natthaphol Teepsuwan became the owner and the chairman of the club. He also changed the logo to be a bull over a background of the Giant Swing, which is a symbol of Bangkok. At that time Bangkok F.C. used Chaloem Phrakiat Bang Mod Stadium as their home field.

Bangkok F.C. played in Regional League Division 2 for three seasons after relegation from Thai Division 1 League in 2007. Their first season in Division 2 was a disaster as the then known Bangkok Bravo finished well adrift at the bottom of the league. The following year in Bangkok Division 2 ended with mid-table respectability.

In 2010 the newly named Bangkok FC finished the league season strongly to win Bangkok Thai Division 2 League. This earned them a place in Division 2 Champions League. The Bulls started poorly but regained some form to creep into 4th place in the play-off. That wasn't enough to earn promotion but it did earn them another play-off opportunity due to the expansion of the 1st division. Their luck was in when they were drawn to play a two legged tie against the hapless Narathiwat. The Bulls duly dispatched Narathiwat 11–2 on aggregate.

The Bulligans managed a creditable 11th-placed finish in their first season back in Division 1, while they finished one place higher in 2012. With big money invested on players and coaching staff, the 10th-placed finish was seen as an underachievement by many.

In 2010 Natthaphol Teepsuwan brought in Thongsuk Sampahungsith, a former Thailand National Team manager, to manage and develop the club. Thongsuk needed only one year to take Bangkok F.C. from Division 2 to Division 1. In 2012, Thongsuk resigned as the manager. Bangkok F.C.'s nickname was "The Iron Bulls", due to their logo that had a bull on it. The fans of this club called themselves "The Bull team" from 2010 to 2012. The next manager was Kiatisuk Senamuang, a former player of the Thailand National Team. He managed the team from 2012 to 2013. Bangkok F.C. ended the 2013 season 4th place of the Division 1 table, so the team was not promoted to the Thai Premier League. In 2014 the Head Coach of the team was Pairoj Borwonwatanadilok former assistance coach of Thailand National Team.

In 2019 Bangkok FC, under new ownership, revamped its logo and became the firebulls, and the tag line "Bangkok Rises" to signify aspirations to develop the team upwards to the top divisions over the next few seasons. Scomadi Thailand became the title sponsor.

Stadium and locations

Season-by-season record

P = Played
W = Games won
D = Games drawn
L = Games lost
F = Goals for
A = Goals against
Pts = Points
Pos = Final position

TPL = Thai Premier League

QR1 = First Qualifying Round
QR2 = Second Qualifying Round
QR3 = Third Qualifying Round
QR4 = Fourth Qualifying Round
RInt = Intermediate Round
R1 = Round 1
R2 = Round 2
R3 = Round 3

R4 = Round 4
R5 = Round 5
R6 = Round 6
GR = Group stage
QF = Quarter-finals
SF = Semi-finals
RU = Runners-up
S = Shared
W = Winners

First team squad

Coaching staff

Head coaches

 Thongsuk Sampahungsith 
 Kiatisuk Senamuang 
 Reuther Moreira 
 Pairoj Borwonwatanadilok 
 Miloš Joksić 
 Ekavee Siriphokasai 
 Sutee Suksomkit 
 Supachart Manakrit 
 Sarawut Treephan  
 Uthai Boonmoh 
 Jakarat Tonhongsa 
 Sean Sainsbury 
 Zarko Djalovic 
 Sebastien Neumann

Honours

Domestic leagues 
Regional League Bangkok Area Division
 Winners (1): 2010

References

 Bangkok FC-history, 2013, bangkokfc [Online], Available: https://web.archive.org/web/20131113024740/http://www.bangkokfc.com/team-history [28 Oct 2013].

External links
 Official Website

Association football clubs established in 2002
Football clubs in Bangkok
Sport in Bangkok
2002 establishments in Thailand